Rhein may refer to:

Places
 Rhine, a major river in Europe
 Rhein, a village in the municipality of Morsbach in North Rhine-Westphalia, Germany
 Rhein (Ostpreussen), a former name of the town Ryn in Poland

Ships
 SMS Rhein, an 1871 steam-powered ironclad monitor of the German Imperial Navy
 SS Rhein (1899), an ocean liner for North German Lloyd
 Rhein (A513), a modern German replenishment ship

People
 Eduard Rhein (1900–1993), German inventor, publisher and author
 Monika Rhein, German oceanographer
 Ralph Rhein (born 1965), Swiss slalom canoer
 Rhein Amacher, American collegiate football player; see 2011 Oregon Ducks football team

Photographs
 Rhein (1996), a photograph created by Andreas Gursky
 Rhein II (1999), a photograph created by Andreas Gursky

Other uses
 Rhein (molecule), a substance in the anthraquinone group found in rhubarb

See also
 Rhein Fire (NFL Europe), a defunct professional American football team in NFL Europe
 Rheintal, the Rhine Valley
 Rhain (disambiguation)